The 2007 Kenya Twenty20 Quadrangular was a Twenty20 International (T20I) cricket tournament held in Kenya from 1 to 4 September 2007. The four participating teams were Bangladesh, Kenya, Pakistan and Uganda (matches involving Uganda were not classed as T20I matches as the team did not hold such status). The matches were all played at the Gymkhana Club Ground in Nairobi.

For Bangladesh, Kenya and Pakistan, this tournament was a warm-up for the inaugural ICC World Twenty20 that was to be held later in September.

Results

Matches

References

External links
 Series home at ESPNcricinfo

International cricket competitions in 2007–08
Twenty20 International cricket competitions
International cricket competitions in Kenya